This article describes the knockout stage of the 2015–16 EHF Champions League.

Qualified teams
The top six placed teams from each of the two groups advanced to the knockout stage.

Format
12 teams played a home and away in the first knock-out phase, with the 10 teams qualified from groups A and B and the two teams qualified from groups C and D. After that, the six winners of these matches in the first knock-out phase joined with the winners of groups A and B to play a home and away for the right to play in the final four.

Round of 16

|}

Matches

MVM Veszprém won 70–52 on aggregate.

Vive Targi Kielce won 65–58 on aggregate.

Flensburg-Handewitt won 59–57 on aggregate.

Vardar won 55–54 on aggregate.

THW Kiel won 65–62 on aggregate.

Zagreb won 54–53 on aggregate.

Quarterfinals

|}

Matches

Paris Saint-Germain won 60–52 on aggregate.

THW Kiel won 59–57 on aggregate.

MVM Veszprém won 59–56 on aggregate.

Vive Targi Kielce won 57–56 on aggregate.

Final four

The final four was held at the Lanxess Arena in Cologne, Germany on 28 and 29 May 2016. The draw was held on 3 May 2016 at 12:00.

Bracket

Semifinals

Third place game

Final

References

External links
Final four website

knockout stage